Ueta (written:  or ) is a Japanese surname. Notable people with the surname include:

, Japanese murderer
, Japanese volleyball player
, Japanese triple jumper

See also
1619 Ueta, a main-belt asteroid
Ueta Station, a railway station in Toyohashi, Aichi Prefecture, Japan
Uniform Electronic Transactions Act
Ueda (disambiguation)

Japanese-language surnames